1,3,7-Trimethyluric acid, also referred to as trimethyluric acid and 8-oxy-caffeine, is a purine alkaloid that is produced in some plants and occurs as a minor metabolite of caffeine in humans. The enzymes that metabolize caffeine into 1,3,7-trimethyluric acid in humans include CYP1A2, CYP2E1, CYP2C8, CYP2C9, and CYP3A4.

References

External links
 MSDS entry

Caffeine
Xanthines